Afonso Maria Pereira Martins Gouveia Brito (born 5 May 1999) is a Portuguese professional footballer who plays as a midfielder.

Club career
He made his Primeira Liga debut for Feirense on 20 April 2019 in a game against Braga.

References

External links

1999 births
Living people
Sportspeople from Santa Maria da Feira
Portuguese footballers
Association football defenders
Primeira Liga players
Segunda División B players
FC Jumilla players
C.D. Feirense players